The School of Advanced Studies (SAS) is a greenfield experimental higher institution at the University of Tyumen in Siberia, Russia, focusing on both teaching and multidisciplinary research.

Academics 
SAS curricula contains core and elective courses. Electives are courses that both permanent and visiting faculty offer for all the SAS students based on the faculty's research interests. Out of 4 weekly sessions, one is reserved for student teamwork. In the academic year 2019–20, SAS offered 31 different electives.

During the first two years, students follow the core curriculum and also take elective courses. Afterwards, students declare one of the seven majors: Information Technology and Digital Society, Cultural Studies, Life Sciences, Economics, Film and Media Studies, Historical Studies, and Sociology and Anthropology. Additionally, students complete one of the minors.

In addition to the BA program, SAS offers a Master program: Master of Arts in Experimental Higher Education. The Experimental Higher Education (MA X-HE) program was launched in 2020. It is a 2-year long program which aims to train its students to become professionals in higher education, focusing on educational innovations. Innovative and experimental teaching methods are also implemented in undergraduate study programs, such as the use of Wikipedia as a tool for academic service learning to foster students' development of 21st century skills (see: Wikipedia:School and university projects).

Research 
SAS research is carried out in multidisciplinary research teams. In 2020, there were four research teams operating within SAS:

 Citizenship Reframed: Reimagining Political Belonging through the Environment, Psychology, and Visuality;
 Education in the Tragic Key: Learning in an age of Crisis and Anxiety;
 Free Will, Consciousness, Determinism: An Interdisciplinary Investigation;
 Unnaturally Human: Enhancement and Manipulation of Human Capacity to Perceive and Perform.

Faculty 
SAS faculty are a combination of full-time professors and visiting professors. Faculty are selected via the Project Design Session cluster hiring process, based on how they perform in multidisciplinary teamwork exercises.

Academic writing center 
The Academic writing center helps SAS students with their writing by offering them feedback in the form of one-on-one consultations. The AWC also organises workshops for the students.

Outreach 
During the academic year, SAS offers open courses twice a week, which are free for the public to attend, are recorded and published on the School's YouTube channel. Every summer, SAS runs a summer school for high-school students.

Each year, SAS organizes a conference. The past conferences include:

 Disciplinary Landscape — 2020, "Dare to Experiment: Higher Education between Safety and Danger";
 Love is Revolting: interdisciplinary symposium;
 The ultimate goal of the workshop is to find a path forward for the research on materiality and love, but even more so for an interdisciplinary rapport;
 Disciplinary Landscape — 2018, "Critical Thinking in Academia Today";
 Disciplinary Landscape — 2017, "Disciplinary Regimes of Truth";
 The Duration of Immersion

Controversy 

A sociologist who worked at SAS and interviewed faculty and students about their experience, published an article in openDemocracy in 2020, where she described it as an "abusive institution" and an "academic sweatshop."

An analysis representing an opposing view of SAS has recently been published by a team of Stanford graduate students who interviewed management-approved faculty and administrators under the title "Reimagining Russian Higher Education". This belongs to the burgeoning genre of SAS puff-pieces placed in venues that only appear to have disinterested editorial standards by SAS management, and can be accurately described as propaganda.

References

External links

Education in Tyumen Oblast
Universities in Russia
Tyumen